New Albany is a city in the U.S. state of Ohio, located  northeast of the state capital of Columbus. Most of the city is located in Franklin County and a small portion extends into adjacent Licking County. New Albany had a population of 10,825 at the 2020 census. Founded in 1837, it is now a growing suburb in the Columbus metropolitan area.

History

The land that was to become the city was founded in the center of Plain Township in 1837 by Nobel Landon and William Yantis. One theory about the name "New Albany" is that some of the original settlers migrated from the Albany, New York, area. Albany, Ohio was laid out in about 1832, which was prior to the founding of New Albany. During its history, the community has also been known by the name of "Hope".

In 1856, New Albany was incorporated with a population of 50, and the first mayor (S. Ogden) was elected. The Wilkins Lumber Mill, later renamed the New Albany Mill, opened in 1881. In 1922, Mrs. Edward Babbitt was elected the first female mayor of New Albany.

In 1970, New Albany was much smaller than it is today, only consisting of a small part of Plain Township that did not touch Columbus. The first annual New Albany Founders' Day Celebration was held in 1976. As late as 1980, the census only listed 414 residents in the village.

Rapid growth in New Albany began in the 1990s, partly due to the expansion of the Les Wexner clothing empire and Wexner's construction of his mansion (the second largest in central Ohio behind the Longaberger mansion off Kitzmiller Road in the village). State Route 161 and access to 161 from I-270 was reconfigured around this time, allowing freeway access into and out of town.

In 2008, the New Albany Mill closed 119 years after its downtown opening. The original sawmill had been converted to a hardware store and was a staple in the lives of many of the residents of New Albany.

The 2009 Fathima Rifqa Bary controversy occurred in New Albany and made national headlines. New Albany teen Bary (raised Muslim but a convert to Christianity) ran away from home to Florida, claiming that as a convert she feared that she would be killed by her family, a claim her parents called untrue.

Geography

New Albany is located in northeastern Franklin County at  (40.078643, −82.820618), with a portion extending east into Licking County.

New Albany is situated in the headwaters of the Rocky Fork, a tributary of Big Walnut Creek. Rose Run and Sugar Run, tributaries of the Rocky Fork, flow northeast to southwest throughout the city. Blacklick Creek runs through the eastern end of the city.

Neighborhoods
In the center of the city, three main roads cross: Dublin-Granville, U.S. Route 62/Johnstown Road, and New Albany-Reynoldsburg/Ohio Route 605/New Albany-Condit.  These three roads divide the city into six roughly equal sections.  In the southwest section is the New Albany Country Club, much of the club's golf course (designed by Jack Nicklaus), and Market Square.  The south-central section contains the remainder of the golf course, with the rest mostly residential.  The northwest section houses New Albany Schools and the performing arts center. The New Albany Links golf course (designed by Barry Serafin) and the surrounding neighborhoods are in the north-central section, along with Bevelhymer Park and the headquarters of Justice.  Lastly, the northeast section contains the Mt. Carmel New Albany Surgical Hospital and the new headquarters of Bob Evans Farms, Inc.

The city is divided into many subdivisions.  North of Dublin-Granville Road are: Asbury Ridge, Cedarbrook, Hampstead Green, Hampstead Heath, New Albany Links, Tidewater, Upper Clarenton, and Windsor.  South are the neighborhoods of:  Alban Mews, Ashberry Ridge, Brandon, Clivdon, Crescent, Edge of Woods, The Farms, Fenway, Hawksmoor, Keswick, Lambton Park, Lansdowne, North Of Woods, Planter's Grove, the Reserve, Tensweep, Upper Brandon, Waterston, and Wiveliscombe.

Demographics

Per the U.S. Census Bureau, 75.4% of New Albany residents over the age of 25 are college graduates, the median home value is $494,600 and the median household income is $203,194.

2010 census
As of the census of 2010, there were 7,724 people, 2,406 households, and 2,138 families living in the village. The racial makeup of the village was 87.7% White, 3.1% African American, 0.1% Native American, 6.5% Asian, 0.1% Pacific Islander, 0.4% from other races, and 2.1% from two or more races. Hispanic or Latino of any race were 2.0% of the population.

There were 2,406 households, of which 58.9% had children under the age of 18 living with them, 80.6% were married couples living together, 5.5% had a female householder with no husband present, 2.7% had a male householder with no wife present, and 11.1% were non-families. 9.1% of all households were made up of individuals, and 2.8% had someone living alone who was 65 years of age or older. The average household size was 3.21 and the average family size was 3.43.

The median age in the village was 37.9 years. 36.6% of residents were under the age of 18; 3.9% were between the ages of 18 and 24; 24.8% were from 25 to 44; 28.3% were from 45 to 64; and 6.5% were 65 years of age or older. The gender makeup of the village was 49.6% male and 50.4% female.

2000 census
As of the census of 2000, there were 3,711 people, 1,263 households, and 1,030 families living in the village. The population density was 415.7 people per square mile (160.5/km2). There were 1,424 housing units at an average density of 159.5 per square mile (61.6/km2). The racial makeup of the village was 94.18% White, 1.56% African American, 0.32% Native American, 2.75% Asian, 0.35% from other races, and 0.84% from two or more races. Hispanic or Latino of any race were 0.81% of the population.

There were 1,263 households, out of which 46.2% had children under the age of 18 living with them, 75.1% were married couples living together, 4.1% had a female householder with no husband present, and 18.4% were non-families. 15.6% of all households were made up of individuals, and 3.5% had someone living alone who was 65 years of age or older. The average household size was 2.94 and the average family size was 3.30.

In the village the population was spread out, with 33.1% under the age of 18, 4.2% from 18 to 24, 28.6% from 25 to 44, 26.6% from 45 to 64, and 7.5% who were 65 years of age or older. The median age was 38 years. For every 100 females, there were 98.0 males. For every 100 females age 18 and over, there were 97.1 males.

The median income for a household in the village was $102,180, and the median income for a family was $119,171. Males had a median income of $100,000 versus $36,563 for females. The per capita income for the village was $62,131. About 1.2% of families and 1.2% of the population were below the poverty line, including 0.5% of those under age 18 and none of those age 65 or over.

Religion
New Albany has a sizable Jewish population  as a percentage of total population, second only to Bexley in central Ohio . New Albany is home to Temple Beth Shalom, the Columbus Jewish Day School, the Chabad Center for a Jewish Tomorrow, and central Ohio's newest Jewish Community Center.

Economy

The New Albany Market Square, a popular community gathering place in the center of the city, is home to many businesses, including Starbucks, Learning Express, New Albany Realty, Rusty Bucket Corner Tavern, and the New Albany Branch of the Columbus Metropolitan Library.

Notable companies headquartered in New Albany include Abercrombie & Fitch (part of the retail clothing conglomerate built by Les Wexner) and Commercial Vehicle Group. The former is the leading employer within the city boundaries.  On March 10, 2011, Bob Evans Farms, Inc. announced plans to move their corporate headquarters (and almost 400 corporate employees) from the south side of Columbus to New Albany. Construction on their headquarters was completed in 2013. Other employers in the city include Discover Financial Services, Aetna Life Insurance, American Electric Power, UBS, New Albany-Plain Local School District, and the Mount Carmel New Albany Surgical Hospital.  Most of the large office buildings housing these employers lie in a corridor between Route 161 and Central College Road to the north.

Facebook opened a data center in New Albany in 2020. Google has broken ground on its own data center. In January 2022, Intel announced plans to build the world's largest semiconductor fabrication plant on 926 acres of land that was approved to be annexed into New Albany. Construction began in September 2022, and is scheduled to be completed in late 2025.

Arts and culture
The New Albany community has shown strong support for the performing arts. Located in the city are the New Albany Symphony Orchestra and the New Albany Ballet Company.  In 2002, the New Albany Community Foundation approached the Columbus Metropolitan Library (CML) to see if CML would build a library branch in New Albany if the Foundation would donate the book collections and computers. After a fundraising campaign, the library was built in the Market Square area.

Inspired by the success of the library, the Village of New Albany, Plain Township, and the New Albany-Plain Local School District partnered together in the development of the Jeanne B. McCoy Community Center for the Arts, named after the late wife of John G. McCoy and mother of John B. McCoy. The  brick building (located contiguous to the downtown learning campus containing the district schools) contains a 786-seat auditorium with balcony seating, a rehearsal studio, a dance studio, a scene shop, and classrooms dedicated to the performing arts. Land for the $15 million facility was donated by The New Albany Company.

Each May since 1976, New Albany residents celebrate Founders Day with a parade, festival, rides, vendors and street performers.

Taste of New Albany is an annual culinary event (each August since 2002) that draws thousands to Market Square in downtown New Albany to sample (for an entry fee) food from dozens of restaurants.  The proceeds from this event benefit the New Albany Chamber of Commerce.

The New Albany Walking Classic is a 10K walking event held annually in early September in New Albany since 2005. It draws thousands of walkers from the Ohio area and beyond, and had over 2,600 finishers in the 2009 race. The event was named the country's best walking event in 2008 by Walk magazine, and is now the country's largest walk-only race. Building on the success of the walking event, community members and civic leaders created the nonprofit Healthy New Albany and opened the Philip Heit Center for Healthy New Albany.

The New Albany Classic is a USEF/FEI-sanctioned equestrian event held each September since 1998 on the estate of Les Wexner and his wife Abigail, founder of the event. The event raises money for the Columbus Coalition Against Family Violence. The related Family Day has many activities, including a concert, amusement rides, and displays of animals from the Columbus Zoo and Aquarium.

Teen band New Hollow is based in New Albany; the members of the band met in New Albany schools.

Government
New Albany is a part of Ohio's 12th congressional district, currently represented by congressman Troy Balderson.

Notable people
 Julia DeVillers, author of books for girls
 David Goodman, director of the Ohio Department of Commerce, state senator
 Jean-Luc Grand-Pierre, player in the National Hockey League (NHL)
 Darron Lee, player in the National Football League (NFL)
 Bobby Rahal, IndyCar Series team owner, three-time IndyCar Series champion, 1986 Indianapolis 500 winner, 14-times Indy 500 starter and Formula One driver
 Graham Rahal, IndyCar driver and son of Bobby Rahal; 2011 24 Hours of Daytona winner
 Kiefer Sherwood, player in the NHL
 Les Wexner, founder and CEO of L Brands

References

External links
 
 New Albany - Plain Local School District
 New Albany Chamber of Commerce
 Demographic info at City-Data.com
 New Albany – Plain Township Historical Society
 New Albany Community Foundation

Populated places established in 1837
1837 establishments in Ohio
Cities in Franklin County, Ohio
Cities in Licking County, Ohio
Cities in Ohio